Day Out with Thomas is a trade name, licensed by Mattel for tourist events that take place on heritage railways and feature one or more engines decorated to look like characters from the popular long-running classic British children's television series, Thomas the Tank Engine & Friends. The events are held around the world in Australia, Canada, Japan, the Netherlands, New Zealand, the United Kingdom, and the United States of America. They include a full-day of activities for families in addition to rides on trains pulled by the iconic engine, Thomas.

Family activities 
Day Out With Thomas family events include interactive train rides and activities like live entertainment, scavenger hunts, bounce houses, mazes, lawn games, and stage shows. For example, at select events in Ohio, families could have fun with a straw bale maze, bounce castles, portable mini golf, model train displays, balloon artists, and Thomas Wooden Railway train tables.

In addition to seeing Thomas and other train engines from the show, there are also appearances by and chances to meet characters like Sir Topham Hatt and Rusty and Dusty. The events usually last all day and are attended by thousands of people.

Full-scale Thomas engines 
The Nene Valley Railway at Peterborough in England was the very first railway in the world to possess a full-scale replica of Thomas. This was an industrial tank engine built by Hudswell Clarke in 1947. It has been nicknamed "Thomas" due to its bright blue livery and resemblance to the famous tank engine. In 1971, the Rev. W. Awdry made the name official.

Since then other tank engines around the world have been dressed up as Thomas. Some heritage railways, most notably the Strasburg Rail Road and Mid Hants Railway, built working locomotives from original engines. This caused some controversy among railway preservationists who claimed it disfigured historic locomotives and trivialized the preservation movement. However, those in favor claimed the new projects would draw much-needed visitors and would help associate interest into steam and diesel engines and historical train travel with young children. Since then, railways experienced an increase of income with appearance fees for "Thomases" to railways that do not have a Thomas replica of their own.

From 2008 onwards, many heritage railways in the UK have withdrawn their "Day Out With Thomas" events due to HiT's revised licensing conditions, which includes the requirement for enhanced criminal records (CRB) checks on all the railway's staff and volunteers.  However, the "Day Out With Thomas" events have thrived in the United States and Canada.

Country Events

Australia
In Australia, several railways have hosted Day Out With Thomas events: in New South Wales the Zig Zag Railway (temporarily closed, scheduled to reopen in late 2021), Lithgow, and the NSW Rail Museum, Thirlmere; in Queensland, the Workshop Rail Museum; and in Victoria the Puffing Billy Railway and the Bellarine Railway.

Netherlands
In the Netherlands annually, these events are held at Het Spoorwegmuseum in Utrecht.

New Zealand
In New Zealand, Mainline Steam's Bagnall tank locomotive has appeared as Thomas on a number of different locations, including at the Britomart Transport Centre in Auckland and has also appeared at the extremely popular biannual "Day out with Thomas the Tank Engine" weekends at the Glenbrook Vintage Railway, south of Auckland.

United Kingdom
Many heritage railways up and down the UK have hosted Day Out With Thomas events over the years; some events feature just Thomas himself, whilst others, such as the Watercress Line, East Lancashire Railway, East Anglian Railway Museum, Whistlestop Valley,  Bo'ness and Kinneil Railway and the Caledonian Railway (Brechin) also feature some of Thomas' friends such as Percy, Diesel, Mavis and Duck. As of 2022, 9 Heritage Railways in the UK host Day Out With Thomas events. Some railways also host ‘Festive’ Day Out With Thomas which features Father Christmas and additional activities. As a result of the licensing costs and other demands imposed by Mattel/HiT, some railways have replaced their Thomas events with similar ones which also feature engines with faces.

U.K. Railways that Have Day Out With Thomas events
Buckinghamshire Railway Centre
East Lancashire Railway
Mid-Hants Railway
East Anglian Railway Museum
Nene Valley Railway
Whistlestop Valley
Bo’ness & Kinneil Railway
Swindon & Cricklade Railway
Caledonian Railway (Brechin)

United States and Canada

Events have been held in many U.S. states, including Colorado, Minnesota, Pennsylvania, Georgia, Michigan, Maryland, Washington, California, Ohio, and North Carolina. In Canada, Thomas has visited locations including Toronto, Calgary, and Squamish.

Engines 
In the United States there are six traveling Thomas engines: one that is an actual steam locomotive, and the other five that are replica engines. All were decorated or built by Strasburg Railroad, with the real steam engine being decorated from Brooklyn Eastern District Terminal No. 15. The replica engines usually consist of a steam or diesel locomotive operated as a pusher, with an unpowered Thomas engine at the opposite end. Thomas's whistle is an air whistle and it is powered by the train's compressed air system. One replica is a narrow gauge, while the other four are standard gauge. While in transit between events, Thomas' face is covered. The replicas are transported from location to location via flatbed truck. Thomas appears in full dress at Day Out With Thomas events hosted by railroads in arrangement with Mattel. Many of the larger railroad museums and tourist railroads across the United States host Day out with Thomas events periodically. The same trains are also used for the three Canadian events (in BC, Alberta and Ontario).  The National Railroad Museum in Green Bay, Wisconsin was the first railroad museum in the United States to host a "Day Out With Thomas" event, unveiling a small Thomas replica in December 1996.

In September 2014, a full-scale replica of Percy was built. This Percy is also a replica engine. Prior to Percy's introduction, Thomas' original face was replaced in April 2014 with the animatronic CGI face with the mouth’s ability to open and close, and a voice speaker. The voice lines for Thomas are provided by Martin Sherman (Thomas' voice actor from 2009-2015) (only for the steam locomotive version as of 2022), while the voice lines for Percy were provided by Christopher Ragland (voice actor for Percy from 2015-2021).

In 2019, Mavis the diesel engine (introduced in Tramway Engines, the last of the original books) was introduced at the Strasburg Rail Road's event "Thomas, Mavis, and the Strasburg Spooktacular". Strasburg's SW8 #8618 switcher was redressed as Mavis for the event.

In 2020 the Strasburg Railroad introduced Rusty. Rusty is represented by the Strasburg Railroads Plymouth Gas Locomotive #2 with altered lettering in a similar fashion to how Mavis was created.
So far Rusty has not run any trains but is instead on display for photo opportunities.

In 2022, the Thomas replicas had their voices re-recorded by Meesha Contreras to fit with the All Engines Go reboot. The Percy replicas were also re-recorded to his reboot voice by Charlie Zeltzer. The steam locomotive at Strasburg retains Martin Sherman as its voice actor.

Japan

Japan's Oigawa Railway started running Thomas events in 2014. Families can travel from Shin-Kanaya Station to Senzu Station. There are activities and treats during the ride and at both terminals.

Engines and characters 
The Thomas used at the Oigawa Railway is a modified and repainted version of the railway's existing JNR Class C11 227 locomotive. In addition to Thomas, two other locomotives at the railway were rethemed: The JNR Class 9600 49616 became a Hiro replica, which is displayed at the station yard of Senzu Station, while the Class DB1 No. DB9 became a Rusty replica.

In 2015, the railway introduced another full-service engine: James, which was repainted from their JNR Class C56 No. 44 locomotive. The railway also refurbished and re-decorated their disused JNR Class C12 No. 208 engine as a non-functioning replica of  Percy, which sits alongside the Class 9600 that is decorated as Hiro.

In 2016, a Hino Poncho bus was redecorated into a replica of Bertie. The Troublesome Trucks were also introduced, which are pulled by Rusty.

In 2018, a replica of Winston the track inspection car was introduced and guests can ride and operate him by pedaling. A replica of Flynn the fire truck was introduced in 2019, followed by a replica of Bulgy the double-decker bus in 2020, which runs alongside the existing replica of Bertie.

The Thomas locomotive was given a repaint in 2021 under the guise of his green LBSC livery from The Adventure Begins.

In August 2022, A Toby replica was added to the lineup, which is modified and repainted from a DD20 diesel rngine.

Gallery

References

External links

Thomas & Friends